The 1973 Munich WCT, also known as the German Professional Championships, was a men's tennis tournament played on indoor carpet courts in Munich, West Germany. The tournament was part of Group A of the 1973 World Championship Tennis circuit. It was the inaugural edition of the event and was held from 2 April until 8 April 1973. First-seeded Stan Smith won the singles title.

Finals

Singles
 Stan Smith defeated  Cliff Richey 6–1, 7–5

Doubles
 Niki Pilić /  Allan Stone defeated  Cliff Drysdale /  Cliff Richey 7–5, 5–7, 6–4

References

External links
 ITF tournament edition details

Munich WCT
Munich WCT